The 2014–15 Stetson Hatters women's basketball team will represent Stetson University in the 2014–15 NCAA Division I women's basketball season. The Hatters were coached by seventh year head coach Lynn Bria and were members of the Atlantic Sun Conference. They finish the season 23-8, 11-3 in A-Sun play for a second-place finish. They advance to the semifinals of the 2015 Atlantic Sun women's basketball tournament where they lost to Northern Kentucky. They were invited to the 2015 Women's National Invitation Tournament where they lost to Richmond in the first round.

Media
All home games and conference road will be shown on ESPN3 or A-Sun.TV. Non conference road games will typically be available on the opponents website. Audio broadcasts of Hatters games can be found on WSBB AM 1230/1490 with Ryan Rouse on the call.

Roster

f

Schedule

|-
!colspan=9 style="background:#3D8E33; color:#FFFFFF;"|Exhibition

|-
!colspan=9 style="background:#3D8E33; color:#FFFFFF;"|Regular Season

|-
! colspan=9 style="background:white;"|2015 Atlantic Sun Tournament

|-
! colspan=9 style="background:white;"|WNIT

See also
 2014–15 Stetson Hatters men's basketball team

References

Stetson
Stetson Hatters women's basketball seasons
2015 Women's National Invitation Tournament participants
Stetson Hatters
Stetson Hatters